Leonid Viktorovich Mikhelson (born 11 August 1955) is a Russian-Israeli billionaire businessman, CEO, chairman and major shareholder of the Russian gas company Novatek.

After the collapse of the Soviet Union, Mikhelson obtained a stake in a privatized pipeline construction company out of which he formed Novatek. He is a business partner of Russian billionaire Gennady Timchenko, a close confidante of Russian leader Vladimir Putin.

According to Bloomberg Billionaires Index, he had a net worth of US$28.8 billion, as of August 2022, making him the 44th richest person in the world and the second richest in Russia.

Biography
Born to an Ashkenazi Jewish family, Mikhelson began his career as an engineer after graduating with a degree in Industrial Civil Engineering from the Samara Institute of Civil Engineering in 1977. He started working as a foreman at a construction and assembling company in the Tyumen area of Siberia. One of his initial projects was work on the Urengoi-Chelyabinsk gas pipeline. In 1985, he was appointed as Chief Engineer of Ryazantruboprovodstroy. In 1987, he became General Director of Kuibishevtruboprovodstroy. In 1991, Kuibishevtruboprovodstroy was one of the first companies to undergo privatization after the dissolution of the Soviet Union.

Mikhelson continued as Managing Director at the company, which has been renamed NOVA, until October 1994. He then became General Director of its holding company, Novafinivest, which later became known as NOVATEK. From 2008 until 2010 Mikhelson was Chairman of the Board of Directors for OAO Stroytransgas and OOO Art Finance. He currently holds the position of Chairman of the Board of Directors of ZAO SIBUR and serves on the Supervisory Board of OAO Russian Regional Development Bank.

SIBUR is a gas processing and petrochemicals company operating 26 production sites across Russia with headquarters in Moscow. Mikhelson owns 57.5% interest in Sibur. He also holds a 25% stake in Novatek.

He also owns the megayacht Pacific.

Mikhelson has a strong interest in art, stating that “99 per cent” of his interest is in Russian and contemporary art. He also established his own foundation, the V-A-C Foundation, which promotes contemporary Russian art, and has international ties with the New Museum in New York, the Tate museums in the UK, and London's Whitechapel gallery. In May 2017, the foundation also opened an exhibition space in Venice and work is underway to develop V-A-C's first major art centre in Moscow, whose main site is an historic power station on the banks of the Moskva River. Designed by Renzo Piano Building Workshop, the new centre for contemporary arts and culture in Moscow is due to open in 2021.

Notable Partnerships 
Mikhelson often partners with Russian billionaire Gennady Timchenko on business and investment projects. They are partners and majority shareholders in Novatek and Sibur. In 2013, Mikhelson and Timchenko sold 12% of Sibur to management partners. Both Mikhelson and Timchenko appear on the Forbes list of billionaires. In 2012, Mikhelson was listed as the second-richest Russian in a number of articles including Bloomberg. Mikhelson and Novatek are the main sponsors of the Russian Football Union.

Mikhelson is the recipient of the Russian Federation's Order of the Badge of Honor.

Personal life
Mikhelson is married, with two children, and lives in Moscow. His daughter Victoria studied art history at New York University and London's Courtauld Institute. His VAC Foundation Victoria, the Art of Being Contemporary, is named after her. Mikhelson also hold an Israeli citizenship.

Mikhelson is one of many Russian "oligarchs" named in the Countering America's Adversaries Through Sanctions Act, CAATSA, signed into law by President Donald Trump in 2017.

See also 
List of Russian billionaires
 Energy policy of Russia

References

External links
 Stocks - Bloomberg 
 Leonid Viktorowitsch Mikhelson 
 The world's 50 Richest Jews: 31-40 By JERUSALEM POST STAFF, 09/07/2010

Russian oligarchs
Russian Jews
1955 births
Living people
People from Kaspiysk
Russian billionaires
Russian people of Jewish descent
People named in the Paradise Papers
Russian construction businesspeople
Russian businesspeople in Israel